Georgina Carolina Verbaan (born 9 October 1979) is a Dutch actress and singer. Verbaan is best known for her recurring role in soap opera Goede Tijden, Slechte Tijden. She has also appeared in various Dutch films, including Costa!, Volle maan and Oogverblindend.

Early life
Verbaan was born in The Hague, Netherlands. She joined a musical group in her hometown, Zoetermeer, in 1990, at the age of 11. In 1992, Verbaan started attending a theatre school in The Hague. She graduated from mavo (high school) in Zoetermeer.

Career

1997-2003: Soap opera, music and film
Verbaan joined the cast of soap opera Goede Tijden, Slechte Tijden in 1997, at the age of 16. She played the recurring role of Hedwig Harmsen from 1997 to 2000, growing increasingly popular and famous during her tenure on the show.

Verbaan left the show in 2000, seeking to pursue an acting career. She appeared in the Dutch film Costa! in 2001. Costa! was a nationwide commercial success, attracting over 200,000 visitors. Verbaan sang the film's theme song.

Verbaan had a cameo in English-language, Dutch film Soul Assassin in 2001. She made a major appearance in Dutch film Volle maan in 2002, but the film was a commercial and critical failure. Verbaan had the lead role in 2003 film Adrenaline.

In 2002, she released her debut studio album Sugar Spider that resulted in a number of radio hits including "Ritmo", "Yo quiero bailar" a cover of Sonia & Selena and "Denis" a cover of Blondie.

Verbaan received a Golden Onion (Dutch: Gouden Ui), the Dutch equivalent to a Golden Raspberry, for her performance in the 2005 film Joyride.

2004-06: Politics

In 2006, Verbaan, a vegetarian and anti-fur activist, began speaking in support of the Party for the Animals (PVDD). In the 2006 Dutch general election, she appeared on the PVDD's list, among other prominent Dutch celebrities, such as acclaimed writer Jan Wolkers. Verbaan received 1,337 votes, while the PVDD received enough votes to secure two seats in the House of Representatives.

2006-present: Television work
Verbaan starred in series like Dok12 and Floor Faber and had guest appearances several television shows and was a cast member of reality show Ranking the Stars. Later on, she received a recurring role in yet another television series, 't Schaep Met De 5 Pooten. She sang several songs for this series. For her role in this series, she also received a Beeld en Geluid Award ("Screen and Sound Award") for best actress.

In 2009, her role in the film Oogverblindend ("Dazzled"), directed by avantgarde filmmaker Cyrus Frisch, was critically acclaimed. The film was praised in Dutch press as "the most relevant Dutch film of the year".

She also had a minor, non-speaking role as the female bartender in Stanley Tucci's indie film "Blind Date" (2007), based on Theo Van Gogh's 1996 Dutch original. She played a major role in an episode of Dutch crime series "Van God Los" in 2011, playing a woman who kills her sister's friend after this friend has an affair with the woman's partner. For her role, Verbaan received critical acclaim and she was nominated for a Beeld & Geluid Award as best actress. Her episode of Van God Los (Spookbeeld) was also nominated for a Gouden Kalf.

Personal life
Verbaan became involved with trumpeter Rob van de Wouw in 2009. In April 2010, show business newscast RTL Boulevard reported Verbaan was pregnant with the couple's first child. Verbaan gave birth to a daughter, Odilia Lilibet van de Wouw, on October 21, 2010.  In June 2013 Georgina and Rob separated.

Discography

Albums

Singles

Filmography

Films

TV series

Dubbing

Theater

Musicals
2000: De Geest van Laat maar Waaien (2000)

Stage
2005: Oogverblindend written and directed by Cyrus Frisch
2005: De Barones2007: De Batavia written by Marcel Otten and directed by Ignace Cornelissen
2010: Late Avond Idealen directed by Sanne Vogel
2010: Ik hield van Hitler''

References

External links

parool.nl

1979 births
Living people
Actresses from The Hague
20th-century Dutch actresses
Dutch television actresses
Dutch voice actresses
Dutch pop singers
21st-century Dutch singers
21st-century Dutch women singers